The 1991 BP National Championships was a men's tennis tournament played on outdoor hard courts in Wellington in New Zealand and was part of the World Series of the 1991 ATP Tour. It was the fourth edition of the tournament and was held from 31 December 1990 through 6 January 1991. Third-seeded Richard Fromberg won the singles title.

Finals

Singles
 Richard Fromberg defeated  Lars Jönsson 6–1, 6–4, 6–4
 It was Fromberg's 1st singles title of the year and the 3rd of his career.

Doubles
 Luiz Mattar /  Nicolás Pereira defeated  John Letts /  Jaime Oncins 4–6, 7–6, 6–2

See also
 1991 Fernleaf Butter Classic – women's tournament

References

External links
 ITF tournament edition details

BP National Championships
BP National Championships
January 1991 sports events in New Zealand
BP
December 1990 sports events in New Zealand